Doonan may refer to:

Places
Doonan, County Antrim, a townland in Tickmacrevan, County Antrim, Northern Ireland
Doonan, County Fermanagh, a townland in Derryvullan, County Fermanagh, County Tyrone
Doonan, Queensland, a suburb on the Sunshine Coast in Queensland, Australia

People
James Doonan (disambiguation)